Voznesenovka is a rural locality (a selo) in Davydovskoye Urban Settlement, Liskinsky District, Voronezh Oblast, Russia. The population was 1,053 as of 2010. There are 7 streets.

Geography 
Voznesenovka is located 26 km north of Liski (the district's administrative centre) by road. Davydovka is the nearest rural locality.

References 

Rural localities in Liskinsky District